Reggie is a given name. It may also refer to:

 Reggie (album), the seventh studio album of Redman
 Reggie (TV series), a short-lived 1983 series
Reggie's, a diner frequented in the sitcom Seinfeld
 Denis Reggie, American wedding photographer
 an alias of James Dewees (born 1976), American rock musician who released three albums under the band name Reggie and the Full Effect

See also
Reg (disambiguation)
 RGGI (pronounced Reggie), an acronym for the Regional Greenhouse Gas Initiative